Fabrice Kelban (born 9 October 1978 in Villeneuve-Saint-Georges, France) is a French footballer who played two matches for Paris Saint-Germain F.C. in Ligue 1 in the 1997-1998 season and 18 matches for US Créteil-Lusitanos in Ligue 2 in the 1999-2000 season.

Career
Kelbran won the 1997 UEFA European Under-18 Championship with France.

References

External links

1978 births
Living people
French footballers
France youth international footballers
Paris Saint-Germain F.C. players
US Créteil-Lusitanos players
R. Charleroi S.C. players
Association football defenders